Edward "Eddy" Prugh (born November 3, 1989) is an American soccer player.

Career
Prugh began playing college soccer at Whitworth University, before transferring to the Oregon State University and then again to Marshall University in his senior year.

Prugh represented Spokane Spiders, Portland Timbers U23s and West Virginia Chaos in the USL Premier Development League.

After a trial, Prugh was signed by Swedish club Bodens BK in January 2014, where he appeared in 70 matches for the club, during his tenure and tallied 26 goals. He became the captain of the club in his second season.

Prugh signed with USL club Colorado Springs Switchbacks on January 24, 2017.

References

External links
Switchbacks bio

1989 births
Living people
American soccer players
Whitworth Pirates men's soccer players
Oregon State Beavers men's soccer players
Marshall Thundering Herd men's soccer players
Spokane Spiders players
Portland Timbers U23s players
West Virginia Chaos players
Bodens BK players
Colorado Springs Switchbacks FC players
Skellefteå FF players
Association football midfielders
Soccer players from Montana
USL League Two players
USL Championship players
Sportspeople from Bozeman, Montana